Kinsman and Foreman is a 1966 social novel by Nigerian novelist T. M. Aluko. The novel is one of the novels in the Heinemann African Writers Series.Though the civil servant protagonist  attempts to resist the corruption in Nigeria, he cannot and eventually is transferred to a remote position for a job. While representing the social corruption of Nigeria, the novel explores topics that build out of Aluko's experience as a civil engineer. Thematically, the novel focuses on the ethics and cultural conflicts that lead to the corruption.

References

Further reading

1966 Nigerian novels
African Writers Series